Violet Kostanda Duca (born 26 January 1958) is a Turkish former volleyball player and current Fenerbahçe Acıbadem manager. She is of Greek descent. Her father Hristo Kostanda is a former footballer and played for Beşiktaş JK. She played 120 times for national team. .

She played for Eczacıbaşı S.K. and also managed Beşiktaş JK between 2005 and 2008.

Honours

As player
 14 times (1972–73, 1973–74, 1974–75, 1975–76, 1976–77, 1977–78, 1978–79, 1979–80, 1980–81, 1981–82, 1982–83, 1983–84, 1984–85, 1985–86) Turkish Women's Volleyball League Champion with Eczacıbaşı S.K.
 1980 The Champion Clubs Runner-Up with Eczacıbaşı S.K.

As manager
 2010 FIVB World Club Championship Champion with Fenerbahçe Acıbadem
 2011-12 CEV Champions League Champion with Fenerbahçe Universal
 2009-10 CEV Champions League Runner-Up with Fenerbahçe Acıbadem
 2010-11 CEV Champions League Bronze Medalist with Fenerbahçe Acıbadem
 2008–09 Women's CEV Top Teams Cup 3rd place with Fenerbahçe Acıbadem
 2 times (2008–09, 2009–10) Aroma Women's Volleyball League Champion with Fenerbahçe Acıbadem
 1 time (2009–11) Aroma Women's Volleyball League Champion with Fenerbahçe Universal
 1 time (2009) Turkish Cup Champion with Fenerbahçe Acıbadem
 2 times (2009, 2010) Turkish Super Cup Champion with Fenerbahçe Acıbadem

See also
 Turkish women in sports

References

1958 births
Living people
Turkish women's volleyball players
Turkish volleyball coaches
Eczacıbaşı volleyball players
Turkish people of Greek descent
Volleyball players from Istanbul